The United States Senate election of 1946 in New Jersey was held on November 5, 1946. 

Incumbent Republican Senator H. Alexander Smith, who had been elected in a 1944 special election following the death of William Warren Barbour, was re-elected over Democrat George Brunner, the Mayor of Camden.

Republican primary

Candidates
H. Alexander Smith, incumbent Senator since 1944

Results
Senator Smith was unopposed for re-nomination.

Democratic primary

Candidates
George E. Brunner, Mayor of Camden

Results

General election

Candidates
George Breitman (Socialist Workers), activist and editor of The Militant
George E. Brunner (Democrat), Mayor of Camden
John C. Butterworth (Socialist Labor)
Frederick W. Collins (Anti Medical Trust Federation)
Mark M. Jones (Independent American)
George W. Ridout (Prohibition)
Arthur Riley (Socialist)
H. Alexander Smith (Republican), incumbent Senator since 1944

Results

See also 
1946 United States Senate elections

References

New Jersey
1946
1946 New Jersey elections